Wild Season is a 1967 South African drama film directed by Emil Nofal and starring Gert Van den Bergh, Marie Du Toit and Antony Thomas. A family operating a trawler off the South African coast, suffers numerous personal tragedies.

A number of scenes were directed by Jans Rautenbach, because Emil Nofal suffered from seasickness.

Cast
 Gert Van den Bergh - Dirk Maritz
 Marie Du Toit - Martie Maritz
 Joe Stewardson - 1st Mate Tom Sheppard
 Janis Reinhardt - Jess Sheppard
 Antony Thomas - Michael Maritz
 Johan Du Plooy - Hennie de Waal
 Ian Yule - Andy Wilson
 Michael Spalletta - Mario

Bibliography
 Tomaselli, Keyan. The cinema of apartheid: race and class in South African film. Routledge, 1989.

References

External links

1967 films
1967 drama films
English-language South African films
Afrikaans-language films
Films directed by Emil Nofal
Films directed by Jans Rautenbach
South African drama films